The 1949–50 season saw Tottenham win the Second Division and gain promotion back to the First Division. Spurs also completed in the FA Cup and made it to the Fifth round only to be knocked out by Everton at Goodison Park.

This was Arthur Rowe's first season after being appointed Tottenham manager. He used the push-and-run system which provided much success with a 23-game unbeaten run.

Squad

Competitions

Second Division

Fixtures

Source:

FA Cup

Fixtures
Source:

References

Tottenham Hotspur F.C. seasons
Tottenham Hotspur